Jack Taylor is an Irish mystery television drama based on the novels by Ken Bruen. Set in Galway, it features Iain Glen in the eponymous role of Jack Taylor, a former officer with the Garda Síochána (national police) who becomes a "finder" (private investigator) after leaving the service; Taylor looks for clues others have overlooked, and knows the streets of his hometown like the back of his hand.

Premise
Set in Galway, the series is based on Ken Bruen's crime novels and features Iain Glen as the leading character, Jack Taylor, an old-school detective, and a maverick who often drinks much more than is good for him. After he is sacked from the Gardaí (the Irish police force) for assaulting a politician he had stopped for a traffic violation, Jack begins to work as a private investigator, reluctantly taking on cases the police will not investigate. According to the series' voiceover, there are no private eyes in Ireland–"It's too close to being an informant – a dodgy concept". Jack soon realises his experience suits him in his new role. He is aided in his investigations by his contacts, including some of his former Gardaí colleagues, notably Officer Kate Noonan.

Cast
 Iain Glen as Jack Taylor
 Killian Scott as Cody Farraher
 Nora-Jane Noone as Garda Kate Noonan (series 1-2)
 Siobhán O'Kelly as Garda Kate Noonan (series 3)
 Tara Breathnach as Anne Henderson (series 1)
 Frank O'Sullivan as Superintendent Clancy (series 1)
 Bill Murphy as Ford (series 1)
 Pádraic Breathnach as Father Malachy
 Jack Monaghan as Darragh Noonan (series 3)

Background
The first Jack Taylor film, The Guards, received its television debut on Ireland's TV3 on 2 August 2010. It was later shown on Canvas in Belgium with Dutch subtitles, and received its first UK broadcast on Channel 5 on 21 February 2013. Following The Guards, two further films, The Pikemen and The Magdalene Martyrs, were recorded and aired in September 2011. In November 2011 the Irish Film and Television Network reported that a further two films, The Dramatist and Priest, were in production, and that Noone and Scott would once again join Glen, reprising their roles. Aaron Monaghan, Emma Eliza Regan and Gavin Drea would also join the cast. The Dramatist aired on TV3 on 3 March 2013, with Priest debuting a week later. Filming for Shot Down, the sixth episode of the series, and billed as the season one finale, began on 7 June 2013. The film is based on Bruen's novel The Killing of the Tinkers.  Episodes 1 through 6 became available in the US on Netflix Streaming on 19 February 2014, episodes 7 through 9 as of 10 April 2017.

Iain Glen spoke to the Daily Record about his role as Taylor shortly before the series began airing in the UK in February 2013, saying the chance to pay homage to the 1970s film, Chinatown, had inspired him to take the part:I've always fancied playing a private eye, ever since I saw Jack Nicholson play Jake Gittes in Chinatown. It is familiar territory but I think there are various aspects that individualize it. One is Ireland's west coast, which has a stunning coastline, and the town of Galway itself [...] The big advantage of taking stuff from books as well written as Ken Bruen's, is that he offers you fantastic dialogue. It's kind of Philip Marlowe with American, quick, dry one-liners all the way. It's lovely to play.

Episodes

Series 1 (2010–11)

Series 2 (2013)

Series 3 (2016)

Reception

Bernice Harrison of The Irish Times gave the first film, The Guards, a mixed reception.Stylishly filmed by director of photography John Conroy, its cool, contemporary atmosphere was spoiled by the corny device of periodically giving Taylor a voiceover, improbably turning the ex-guard in Galway with a drink problem into an old-style gumshoe in a film noir. Perhaps if it had been just an hour long instead of feature-length, director Stuart Orme would have insisted on a tighter script, been sharper with his edits and made a better drama. The book deserved it and grizzly Jack Taylor is a strong enough character to hang it – or for that matter, a series – on.She was far less positive about the following two films in 2011, finding Glen's Irish accent to be unconvincing.TV3 is showing two more Jack Taylor investigations...and they are even worse than The Guards...The dramas are a mostly German production – filmed partially in Bremen, which may or may not look like Galway – and there's a touch of the Oirish about the whole thing, and not just because Taylor's weapon of choice is a hurley. Glenn [sic], who in The Guards couldn't quite settle on an accent, has now decided to channel Clint Eastwood: his voice is a husky American-tinged drawl that wouldn't have gone down too well in Templemore.

Keith Watson of Metro felt The Guards had several problems, but that Glen had rescued it.Sidestepping gumshoe cliché, Glen gave Taylor a world-weary charisma that lifted him above the odd story he found himself in from failure. A mixed-up yarn involving a dodgy old artist mate, a spot of under-age sex, a femme fatale and some sideswipes at the state of the Irish economy, the plot buckled under its baffling lack of logic. But Glen, peering at the world through Taylor's boozed-up eyes, lent the action a credibility and mystery it scarcely deserved.

David Jenkins of Time Out was more positive about The Guards, although he felt there was nothing new in the storyline.It's all very clichéd, from the wiseacre patter to the generic chase scene through a strangely empty warehouse. But who's complaining when the clichés are thrown together with this much tenderness and panache?

David Stephenson of the UK's Daily Express praised the episode's opening sequence.The first few minutes of this new feature-length drama confirmed in my mind that I was going to enjoy the next 90 minutes. For a start it began with a car chase after Jack had taken a requisite large slug of booze.

Reviewing The Pikemen following its British television debut, the Radio Timess David Butcher was generally positive, praising Glen for his portrayal of the central character.It's not the paciest of crime thrillers but Iain Glen makes Jack the kind of doleful, rugged character you want to keep watching and the story has the right kind of rough edges.

Phil Harrison of Time Out called the second film, "surprisingly enjoyable", but echoed Jenkins's concerns about plot. "[T]he familiar scenarios are at least played out with appropriate relish and conviction and Glen's excellently gnarly in the lead. Daft, grimy fun."

Reviewing the DVD release of the first three films, The Independents Ben Walsh gave it three out of five stars, saying Iain Glen "convinces as damaged Jack Taylor, an alcoholic former cop who now works as a Galway gumshoe."

In March 2013, The Guardians Laura Barnett spoke to Tim Burchell, a real-life private investigator from Private Investigator London, who had a mixed opinion of the series. Burchell told Barnett:The first time I tried to watch this, I turned it off after 20 minutes. I just couldn't stand all the cliches: the heavy-drinking, loner ex-cop. That's not who I am at all [...] I enjoyed it much more the second time. It does show all the groundwork we have to put in: people think we sit and type names into Google, but we're out there, pounding the streets. And although I've never taken on a murder case, as Taylor does, missing-person cases are our bread and butter."He also felt that such shows can give a misleading view of his occupation. "Shows like this are great entertainment, but they do give people the wrong idea."

DVD releases
Lumière released the first five episodes on DVD with Dutch subtitles on 29 January 2013.
Acorn Media released the first three episodes on DVD in the UK on 4 March 2013.

References

External links
 Official Website
 Jack Taylor show page at Channel 5 (UK)
 

2010 Irish television series debuts
2016 Irish television series endings
American mystery television series
Detective television series
English-language television shows
Irish crime television series
Irish drama television series
Television shows based on Irish novels
Television shows set in the Republic of Ireland
Virgin Media Television (Ireland) original programming